Sisan-e Qadim (also Romanized as Sīsān-e Qadīm; also known as Sīsān, Sīsān-e Now, Sīsān-e Qadīmī, and Valī-ye ‘Aşr) is a village in Mehranrud-e Jonubi Rural District, in the Central District of Bostanabad County, East Azerbaijan Province, Iran. At the 2006 census, its population was 41, in 9 families.

References 

Populated places in Bostanabad County